Ribonucleoside-triphosphate reductase (ribonucleotide reductase, 2'-deoxyribonucleoside-triphosphate:oxidized-thioredoxin 2'-oxidoreductase) is an enzyme with systematic name 2'-deoxyribonucleoside-triphosphate:thioredoxin-disulfide 2'-oxidoreductase. This enzyme catalyses the following chemical reaction

 2'-deoxyribonucleoside triphosphate + thioredoxin disulfide + H2O  ribonucleoside triphosphate + thioredoxin

Ribonucleoside-triphosphate reductase requires a cobamide coenzyme and ATP.

References

External links 
 

EC 1.17.4